Baltar is an interior municipality in Ourense (province) in the Galicia region of north-west Spain.  Its population was 986 in 2016 (1002 in 2015, 1149 in 2006, 1177 in 2005, 1180 in 2004, 1189 in 2003), in an area of 93.99 km.

References  

Municipalities in the Province of Ourense